Charles Russell Codman (February 22, 1893 – August 25, 1956) was an American writer, wine expert, and aide to General George S. Patton during World War II.

Biography
Codman was a Boston, Massachusetts native who was born into an old, notable, and wealthy New England family. After graduating from Harvard College in 1915, he enlisted in the American Field Service. When the United States entered World War I, Codman became a pilot and saw combat in France as a first lieutenant in the 96th Aero Squadron. His heroics earned him the Silver Star and the Croix de Guerre.

After the war, Codman worked part-time in France as a wine buyer and part-time in Boston as a real estate manager. When Nazi Germany invaded France in 1940, Codman was in the invaded country on a wine buying trip, and escaped to Lisbon on the last plane out of Bordeaux.

In 1942, Codman re-joined the United States Army at the rank of major. Because of his fluency in the French language, he was assigned as a translator to accompany Operation Torch, the Anglo-American invasion of French North Africa. In the latter stages of the North African Campaign, he met Patton, who soon asked him to serve as his aide-de-camp, which Codman did for the rest of the war. (In the 1970 movie Patton, Codman is played by Paul Stevens.)

In 1945, Codman left the Army at the rank of colonel. He returned to Boston and his real estate business, which he ran until his death.

Codman's marriage to Theodora Larocque lasted more than 35 years. Their only child, a son who was his father's namesake, died at age 24 in Paris in 1946.

Publications
Years and Years : Some Vintage Years in French Wines. Boston : S. S. Pierce, 1935.
Contact. Boston : Little, Brown, 1937.
Drive. Boston : Little, Brown, 1957.

See also

References

Further reading
 "Charles Codman, Realty Man, Dies". New York Times August 26, 1956: 84.
 Codman, Charles R. Drive. Boston : Little, Brown, 1957.

1893 births
1956 deaths
Writers from Boston
United States Army Air Service pilots of World War I
United States Army personnel of World War II
United States Army colonels
Recipients of the Silver Star
Recipients of the Croix de Guerre (France)
Harvard College alumni
20th-century American male writers